The IndUS Entrepreneurs (TiE) is a non-profit organization with a mission to foster entrepreneurship through mentoring, networking, education, funding and incubation. With a focus of giving back to the community, TiE’s focus is on generating and nurturing the next generation of Entrepreneurs. By 2000, TiE-inspired startups had helped create new businesses worth more than US$50 billion in market capitalization, a number that is likely over US$100 billion by 2022.

History
TiE as an idea emerged from a chance meeting at the Santa Clara Marriott in December, 1992, that was being hosted by a group of Indo-American entrepreneurs and executives for a visit by an Indian Government official. A group of seven individuals, led by Ambrish "A.J." Patel (who had proposed the idea of getting together regularly to network and support entrepreneurship), Narpat Bhandari, Kailash Joshi, Roy Prasad, Sam Sathya, Bipin Shah, and Ray Vrudhula formed an ad hoc committee to develop the idea of TiE and create an organization, which they did. Two years later, in December 1994, TiE was established as a formal, not-for-profit organization to foster entrepreneurship and networking. A group of 17 Charter Members formed the foundation of the organization, with Suhas Patil, ex-MIT professor and founder of Cirrus Logic as President, and Kanwal Rekhi, ex-Novell EVP and angel investor, who would be named President Elect. What was all of TiE back then continues to operate as TiE Silicon Valley now, one of some 60 chapters around the world today, with a virtual umbrella entity named TiE Global that oversees all the chapters.

Organization 
Since starting as a single organization called TiE in Silicon Valley, TiE has expanded to 60 chapters in 17 countries, with each chapter identified by the name TiE and the location of the chapter. The chapters are autonomous entities, modeled after the original TiE Silicon Valley chapter, and all the chapters are governed by TiE Global. Each chapter has its own charter members comprising veteran entrepreneurs and executives, and members who are typically aspiring entrepreneurs.

TiECon 
In 1994, TiE organized a 2-day entrepreneurs seminar and workshop in San Jose, California. This event was a brainchild of Suhas Patil, and it was a huge success, attended by 500 aspiring entrepreneurs, corporate executives, venture capital investors, faculty members from Stanford and Berkeley, and representatives of other organizations that service startup companies, such as accounting firms and law firms. This event put TiE on the map in Silicon Valley and TiE instantly became recognized by sponsors as a unique organization that deserved to be supported. The 1995 version of it was named TiEcon by Charter Member Parveen Gupta. Since then, TiEcon has been the flagship TiE event. Several other TiE chapters have often used the TiEcon name for local conferences and workshops on a smaller scale. The main TiEcon is the one that typically happens during the month of May in Santa Clara / San Jose, California, and organized by TiE Silicon Valley.

References

External links 

Non-profit organizations based in the United States